The 2018 Sun Belt Conference men's basketball tournament was the postseason men's basketball tournament for the league for the 2017–18 NCAA Division I men's basketball season. It was held from March 7–11, 2018, in New Orleans, Louisiana, at Lake Front Arena. The tournament winner, Georgia State, received the conference's automatic bid to the NCAA tournament.

Seeds
All 12 conference teams were eligible for the tournament. The top four teams received a bye to the quarterfinals of the tournament. Teams were seeded by record within the conference, with a tiebreaker system to seed teams with identical conference records.

Schedule

Source

Bracket

References

Sun Belt Conference men's basketball tournament
Tournament
Sun Belt Conference men's basketball tournament
Sun Belt Conference men's basketball tournament